|}

The Chester Vase is a Group 3 flat horse race in Great Britain open to three-year-old colts and geldings. It is run over a distance of 1 mile, 4 furlongs and 63 yards at Chester in May.

History
The event was established in 1907, and it was originally open to horses aged three or four. The result of the first running was a dead-heat.

For a period the race was contested over 1 mile, 5 furlongs and 75 yards. It was restricted to three-year-olds and cut to 1 mile, 4 furlongs and 53 yards in 1959. It was abandoned in 1969, and extended by several yards in 1970.

The Chester Vase serves as a trial for the Epsom Derby. The last participant to win the Derby was Wings of Eagles, the 2017 runner-up.

Records

Leading jockey (8 wins):
 Ryan Moore - Doctor Fremantle (2008), Treasure Beach (2011), Ruler Of The World (2013), Orchestra (2014), Hans Holbein (2015), US Army Ranger (2016), Venice Beach (2017), Changingoftheguard (2022)

Leading trainer (10 wins):
 Aidan O'Brien - Soldier Of Fortune (2007), Golden Sword (2009), Treasure Beach (2011), Ruler Of The World (2013), Orchestra (2014), Hans Holbein (2015), US Army Ranger (2016), Venice Beach (2017), Sir Dragonet (2019), Changingoftheguard (2022)

Winners since 1980

Earlier winners

 1907: Earlston / Sancy 
 1908: Galvani
 1909: St Ninian
 1910: Bayardo
 1911: Maaz
 1912: Lycaon
 1913: Cylba
 1914: Dan Russel
 1915: Esplandian
 1916–18: no race
 1919: Air Raid
 1920: Buchan
 1921: no race
 1922: Fodder
 1923: Papyrus
 1924: Inkerman
 1925: Vermilion Pencil
 1926: Swift and Sure
 1927: Lone Knight
 1928: Hectare
 1929: En Garde
 1930: Pinxit
 1931: Sandwich
 1932: Bulandshar
 1933: Hyperion
 1934: Windsor Lad
 1935: Valerius
 1936: Taj Akbar
 1937: Merry Mathew
 1938: Cave Man
 1939: Heliopolis
 1940–45: no race
 1946: Sky High
 1947: Edward Tudor
 1948: Valognes
 1949: Swallow Tail
 1950: Castle Rock
 1951: Supreme Court
 1952: Summer Rain
 1953: Empire Honey
 1954: Blue Rod
 1955: Daemon
 1956: Articulate
 1957: King Babar
 1958: Alcide
 1959: Fidalgo
 1960: Mr Higgins
 1961: Sovrango
 1962: Silver Cloud
 1963: Christmas Island
 1964: Indiana
 1965: Gulf Pearl
 1966: General Gordon
 1967: Great Host
 1968: Remand
 1969: no race
 1970: Politico
 1971: Linden Tree
 1972: Ormindo
 1973: Proverb
 1974: Jupiter Pluvius
 1975: Shantallah
 1976: Old Bill
 1977: Hot Grove
 1978: Icelandic
 1979: Cracaval

See also

 Horse racing in Great Britain
 List of British flat horse races

References

 Paris-Turf:
 Racing Post:

 galopp-sieger.de – Chester Vase.
 ifhaonline.org – International Federation of Horseracing Authorities – Chester Vase (2019).
 pedigreequery.com – Chester Vase – Chester.
 

Flat horse races for three-year-olds
Chester Racecourse
Flat races in Great Britain
1907 establishments in England
Recurring sporting events established in 1907